WCOV-TV (channel 20) is a television station in Montgomery, Alabama, United States, affiliated with the  Fox network. It is owned by Woods Communications Corporation alongside Troy-licensed Cozi TV affiliate WIYC (channel 48) and low-power local weather station WALE-LD (channel 17). The stations share studios on WCOV Avenue in the Normandale section of Montgomery, while WCOV-TV's transmitter is located southeast of Grady along the Montgomery–Crenshaw county line.

History

Early years
On December 31, 1951, the owners of radio station WCOV (1170 AM)—the First National Bank of Montgomery and the estate of G. W. Covington, Jr.—filed an application with the Federal Communications Commission (FCC) for a new television station on VHF channel 12 in Montgomery. Six months later, after the commission lifted its freeze on television applications, WCOV amended its application to specify UHF channel 20—to the surprise of others—after radio station WSFA also filed for channel 12. The FCC granted the Covington interests—which had reorganized as the Capitol Broadcasting Company—a construction permit on September 17, 1952. Later, WCOV-TV would claim that it was forced to apply for channel 20 when it learned RCA could not deliver a VHF transmitter, but had a UHF transmitter on hand.

WCOV-TV was the first television station in Montgomery, making its first broadcast on April 17, 1953. It operated from a  tower near its studios. Commercial programs started five days later; the station was a primary CBS affiliate, but carried secondary affiliations with the other three major networks of the day—NBC, ABC and Dumont. During the late 1950s, the station was also briefly affiliated with the NTA Film Network.

Christmas Day 1954 brought Montgomery a second television station, this time on VHF, when WSFA-TV began broadcasting as an NBC affiliate on channel 12. The arrival of VHF television in Montgomery created an economic and viewership inequality between the city's two television stations. On August 5, 1955, WCOV's studios were badly damaged by a fire, knocking both stations off the air. The fire was caused by a short circuit inside an electric clock, which lost an estimated $500,000 total in damages. The station returned on the air one week later. In 1959, WCOV-TV filed to have channel 8 moved from Selma to Montgomery to put it on an equal footing. When that failed, the station instead proposed that WSFA be moved to the UHF band, an idea that drew protests from viewers—such as those in Butler County—which were served only by channel 12 and which could not receive channel 20. The FCC voted not to pursue deintermixture in Montgomery and other markets in 1962. 1962 also brought the arrival of full three-network service, when channel 32 signed on as ABC affiliate WCCB-TV.

The Covington family sold WCOV radio and television in 1964 for $1.225 million to Gay-Bell Broadcasting, which owned WLEX-TV in Lexington, Kentucky. The new owners built a new  tower at the site of its predecessor. Gay-Bell, however, continued to grapple with its UHF problem in Montgomery. In 1968, it attempted to buy the channel 8 station in Selma, WSLA-TV, which was silent at the time following its destruction by fire, but nothing ever materialized. Channel 20 also continued fighting against multiple attempts by channel 8 to improve its facilities; WCOV-TV had petitioned against applications by WSLA-TV's ownership dating back to 1954.

In 1976, WSLA-TV filed once more for an application to build a maximum-powered site, this time from a tall tower near Lowndesboro. WCOV-TV objected to the proposal and again advocated for the deintermixture of the Selma and Montgomery markets to make all stations UHF; in 1978, it proposed moving channel 8 to Tuscaloosa for educational use and channel 12 to Columbus, with WSFA being reassigned channel 45. The FCC denied the WCOV-TV proposal in May 1980; in July, it then proceeded to approve the WSLA application. Appeals from WCOV and WKAB dragged on for several more years until final approval from the FCC was granted in 1983 and a federal appeals court denied further pleas from the UHF stations the next year.

From CBS to Fox
WSLA-TV's power increase, according to the FCC administrative law judge that had approved the application in 1981, would not jeopardize the service of Montgomery's two UHF television stations. However, much was on the line for WCOV-TV, as the Selma station was also a CBS affiliate. The network had previously reassured channel 20 that it would remain in the network fold, but CBS went back on those claims and informed the station in March 1985 that WAKA would become its sole affiliate in Montgomery the next year, though this was not stated publicly for another two months.

The affiliation uncertainty came the same month as Gay-Bell reached a deal to sell the station to Woods Communications, led by David Woods, son of longtime Alabama broadcaster Charles Woods, for an estimated $4 million; Gay-Bell had also spun off the radio station the year before, and both sales gave the company capital to improve its flagship property in Kentucky. Woods was aware of the impending loss of CBS when he agreed to buy WCOV-TV. CBS was not required to transfer the affiliation to Woods, who closed on the purchase in early December 1985; the network opted to let WCOV-TV remain an affiliate through December 31 as a "courtesy".

WCOV-TV's 32-year affiliation with CBS officially ended on January 1, 1986. It intended to soldier on as Montgomery's first independent station. However, within a few months, the burden of having to buy an additional 18 hours of programming per day had channel 20 on the brink of closure. Years later, Woods recalled that he "didn't even have money to buy toilet paper" and advertisers were shying away. A solution came in the form of a Fox affiliation; WCOV-TV joined the upstart network when it launched in the fall of 1986. Fox proved to be a lifeline to channel 20, despite its technical inferiority to other market stations and having axed its local newscasts; network programs boosted the station's ratings and finances.

WCOV-TV's tower in the Normandale area of Montgomery was destroyed by a massive tornado on March 6, 1996. The station was able to restore service for cable customers later that afternoon with help from WSFA and AT&T Cable (later to become Charter; now Spectrum). One month later, WCOV returned to the air on a temporary  tower. The station applied to the FCC to resume full-power operations using space on WSFA's  tower in Grady, with a power increase from 617 to 2,667 kilowatts. The FCC granted the request and issued a construction permit. In January 1997, the station activated its new transmission facility, which doubled channel 20's coverage area and secured it positions on 23 additional cable systems in the Montgomery market.

Pending sale to Allen Media Group
On December 15, 2021, it was announced that Allen Media Group, a subsidiary of Los Angeles-based Entertainment Studios, would purchase WCOV-TV, WIYC and WALE-LD for $28.5 million, pending FCC approval; at the time, the deal was expected to close in the first half of 2022. The sale will give the stations an in-state sibling in Huntsville-based ABC affiliate WAAY-TV.

Programming
In addition to Fox network programs like The Simpsons, The Masked Singer, NASCAR and the NFL, WCOV carries syndicated programming including The Jennifer Hudson Show, The Big Bang Theory, The People's Court, Judge Mathis and The Andy Griffith Show.

Newscasts

As a CBS affiliate, WCOV operated its own news department, known during its latter years as Eyewitness News. It spent most of its history as a distant runner-up to WSFA. The station shut down its news department in September 1986, nine months after losing the CBS affiliation and shortly before joining Fox. In its last ratings book, channel 20's newscasts were  a solid, if distant, runner-up to WSFA, with more viewers than WAKA and WKAB combined. However, Woods said the "tremendous financial drain" of sustaining a newscast without network support was not worth the effort.

On January 7, 2008, Woods Communications contracted with NBC affiliate WSFA (owned by Raycom Media) to air a half-hour 9 p.m. broadcast in conjunction with another Fox affiliate and Raycom-owned station in Dothan, WDFX-TV.

After WCOV's outsourcing contract with WSFA expired at the end of 2010, it entered into a new agreement with CBS affiliate WAKA to produce a nightly 35-minute prime time newscast at 9 covering Montgomery. WAKA, which merged with WNCF and WBMM on February 4, 2013, continues to produce the newscast.

Technical information

Subchannels
The station's digital signal is multiplexed:

Analog-to-digital conversion
WCOV-TV shut down its analog signal, over UHF channel 20, on February 20, 2009. The station's digital signal relocated from its pre-transition UHF channel 16 to channel 20. At the same time, the station's transmitter was moved from Montgomery to Grady.

References

External links
WCOV-TV "Fox 20"
WCOV-DT2 Antenna TV
WCOV-DT3 This TV
WAKA "CBS 8"

Fox network affiliates
Television channels and stations established in 1953
1953 establishments in Alabama
COV-TV
Antenna TV affiliates
This TV affiliates